Cora yukiboa is a species of basidiolichen in the family Hygrophoraceae. Found in Puerto Rico, it was formally described as a new species in 2016 by Joel Mercado-Díaz, Bibiana Moncada, and Robert Lücking  The specific epithet yukiboa refers to Yukibo, the Taíno chief of the Daguao village where the type locality is. Here it grows as an epiphyte on shrubs.

References

yukiboa
Lichen species
Lichens described in 2016
Lichens of the Caribbean
Taxa named by Robert Lücking
Basidiolichens